The 2018–19 ProA was the 12th season of the ProA, the second level of basketball in Germany. The champions and the runners-up of the play-offs were promoted to the 2019–20 Basketball Bundesliga.

Hamburg Towers won its first ProA championship after defeating Nürnberg Falcons, which promoted too, in the finals. Nürnberg did not promote after all after it could not meet Basketball Bundesliga (BBL) BBL arena requirements.

Teams

Table

Play-offs

References

External links
 Official website
 Eurobasket.com

ProA seasons
Germany
2018–19 in German basketball leagues